Abraham Ruchat (27 February 1680, in Vevey – 29 September 1750, in Lausanne) was a Swiss Protestant theologian and historian.

He studied theology at the Academy of Lausanne, receiving his ordination in 1702. Later on, he served as a minister in the communities of Aubonne (1709–16) and Rolle (1716–21). In 1721 he was appointed professor of rhetoric at the academy, where from 1733 up until his death, he taught classes in theology. In 1736–39 he served as school rector.

In 1727–28 he published several volumes on the Swiss Reformation, titled Histoire de la Réformation de la Suisse — in 1835–38 the work was published in its entirety by Louis Vulliemin (7 volumes). It was later translated into English and published with the title History of the Reformation in Switzerland (1845). In 1714, under the pseudonym "Gottlieb Kypseler", he published a guide for foreigners, Les Délices de la Suisse ("The Delights of Switzerland"; 4 volumes). Another noted work by Ruchat was Abrégé de l'histoire ecclésiastique du Pays de Vaud ("Abstract on the ecclesiastical history of Vaud"; 1707).

With Louis Bourguet, Charles Guillaume Loys de Bochat and Gabriel Cramer, he was editor of the journal Bibliothèque italique, ou, Histoire littéraire de l'Italie.

References 

1680 births
1750 deaths
People from Vevey
University of Lausanne alumni
Academic staff of the University of Lausanne
Swiss Protestant theologians
18th-century Swiss historians